Mariano Rubén Puerta (born 19 September 1978) is an Argentine former professional tennis player. He reached a career-high ATP world No. 9 singles ranking in August 2005. His career highlight of reaching the final of the French Open in 2005 was marred by testing positive for the banned substance etilefrine in a drugs test directly after the French Open final, for which he received an eight-year doping ban.

Tennis career

Puerta made his debut on the ATP Tour in 1997, and turned professional in 1998. He won his first ATP title in 1998 in Palermo, Italy. In 2000, Puerta achieved his highest year-end ranking of World No. 21, reaching five finals, and winning one of them (Bogotá). That same year, however, he underwent wrist surgery, which kept him off the tour for several months.

Besides from not recovering his previous playing level, he was suspended from tennis for 9 months from October 2003 onwards for a doping offense (see section on doping controversies). Owing to the suspension he missed most of the 2004 season, and by August 2004 his world ranking had dropped to No. 440. He was reduced to playing Challenger-level tournaments for a while until he had earned enough points to return to the ATP Tour.

In 2005, Puerta made an eye-opening comeback on the Tour by winning the title in Casablanca and then making it to the final of the world's most prestigious clay court tournament, the French Open, where he eventually succumbed to Rafael Nadal in a close match (7–6(8–6), 3–6, 1–6, 5–7). By August 2005 he had climbed to a career-best World No. 9 in the ATP singles rankings, an advancement of 431 places in one year.

In December 2005, he was, again, suspended for a doping offense, this time for 8 years, effectively ending his professional career. This suspension was later reduced on appeal.

On June 6, 2007 Puerta returned to the professional circuit with a 6–4, 6–3 victory over Australian Joseph Sirianni at the Sassuolo Challenger, a tournament to which he was invited as a wild card since he had no ranking. In the second round, Puerta lost 6–3, 6–0 to Spaniard Marc López. Since returning to the tour, Puerta has only played on the ATP Challenger Tour, including winning the Bogota challenger in 2008 and reaching the final of the San Luis Potosi Challenger in 2008 without dropping a set, where he was forced to default the final, and the Cordenons challenger in 2007.

Playing style 
Puerta is left-handed and uses a single-handed backhand. He is an excellent clay-court specialist with a game that revolves around very accurate and powerful groundstrokes off both wings with heavy topspin. His main weaknesses are his mental strength, slow court speed and comparatively weak serve, the latter two which significantly prevents his success on fast surfaces. He is also very capable at the net, having good volleys and quick reflexes despite his slow court speed.

Doping controversies
In 2003, Puerta received a two-year doping suspension after testing positive for clenbuterol at Viña del Mar. In his defence, he argued that the substance had been administered to him by his doctor to combat asthma and that it had no performance-enhancing effect. The sanction was subsequently reduced to nine months suspension, effective from October 2003, and a $5600 fine.

In December 2005, Puerta was banned again, this time after it was revealed that he had tested positive for the use of the cardiac stimulant etilefrine following his 2005 French Open final loss to Rafael Nadal. News of this positive drug test had been circulating since October 2005. The suspension was for eight years, the longest in tennis history at that time. As a result, Puerta was forced to forfeit all of his rankings points and prize money from the 2005 French Open onwards, and had all his 2005 results from after the French Open annulled. Puerta's finish as a finalist at the 2005 French Open was allowed to remain on the record books.

The International Tennis Federation tribunal noted, however, that "The amount of etilefrine detected in the positive drugs test was too small to have any effect on his performance". Puerta appealed against the ban, claiming on his web site that he only ingested trace amounts of it accidentally left over by his wife in a glass. On July 12, 2006 his suspension was reduced to two years by the Court of Arbitration for Sport, making him eligible to restart his career on June 5, 2007.

Grand Slams finals

Singles: 1 (1 runner-up)

ATP Career Finals

Singles: 10 (3 titles, 7 runner-ups)

Doubles: 3 (3 titles)

ATP Challenger and ITF Futures finals

Singles: 19 (11–8)

Doubles: 10 (5–5)

Junior Grand Slam finals

Singles: 1 (1 runner-up)

Doubles: 1 (1 runner-up)

Performance timelines

Singles

Doubles

Walkovers are neither official wins nor official losses.

See also
List of doping cases in sport

Notes

References

External links 
 
 
 Puerta's Profile
 Sportsline's Profile
 ITF independent anti-doping tribunal decision (PDF)

1978 births
Living people
Argentine male tennis players
Argentine sportspeople in doping cases
Doping cases in tennis
People from San Francisco, Córdoba
Tennis players from Buenos Aires